Bryson Baugus is an American voice actor, who provides voices for English versions of Japanese anime series for Funimation and Sentai Filmworks.

Biography 
Bryson Baugus primarily is known for his work as Pegasus Seiya in Knights of the Zodiac: Saint Seiya (2019) and the original 1986 anime series, Saint Seiya (2019 Sentai/Netflix dub); Shoyo Hinata in Haikyu!!; Bell Cranel in Is It Wrong to Try to Pick Up Girls in a Dungeon?; Falco Grice in Attack on Titan; Narumiya in Tsurune; Kaito Kirishima in Waiting in the Summer; Mitsuru in Darling in the FranXX; Takumi Aldini in Food Wars!: Shokugeki no Soma; Kimihito Kurusu in Monster Musume; Kanade Yuzuriha in Anonymous Noise; and many others. Baugus has a BFA in Acting/Directing at Sam Houston State University.

Filmography

Animation

Anime

Video games

References 

Living people
21st-century American male actors
American male voice actors
Year of birth missing (living people)
Place of birth missing (living people)